Kudiyiruppupalayam  is a village in Bahour Commune of Bahour taluk  in the Union Territory of Puducherry, India. It lies on north side in the Bahour Enclave of Puducherry district.

Geography
Kudiyiruppupalayam is bordered by  Bahour in the west, Seliamedu in the north, Pillaiyarkuppam in east and Bahour in the south.

Road Network
Kudiyiruppupalayam lies on Villianur - Bahour road (RC-18) between Seliamedu and Bahour. Kirumampakkam-Bahour road (RC-27) meets RC18 at Kudiyiruppupalayam.

Villages
Following are the list of villages under Kudiyiruppupalayam Village Panchayat.

 Kudiyiruppupalayam
 Adingapet
 Pinnatchikuppam

Gallery

Politics
Kudiyiruppupalayam is  a part of Embalam (Union Territory Assembly constituency) which comes under Puducherry (Lok Sabha constituency)

References

External links
Official website of the Government of the Union Territory of Puducherry

Villages in Puducherry district